Essam Farah or Essam Samdi, is a Lebanese singer, musician, and songwriter. In 2014 he released his first single Metl el sokker.

Discography

Singles
 Metl el sokker (2014)
 Malyon Bawsi (2014)
 Tayara Waraa (2015)
 Elbet Chocolate (2016)

Videography

References 

Living people
21st-century Lebanese male singers
Musicians from Beirut
Year of birth missing (living people)